The 2019 Sun Belt Conference women's soccer tournament was the postseason women's soccer tournament for the Sun Belt Conference held from November 6 to November 10, 2019. The seven-match tournament took place at the Foley Sports Complex in Foley, Alabama. The eight-team single-elimination tournament consisted of three rounds based on seeding from regular season conference play. The defending champions were the Arkansas-Little Rock Trojans, however they were unable to defend their title after finishing ninth in regular season play and failing to qualify for the tournament.  The South Alabama Jaguars won the title with a 5–1 win over Arkansas State in the final. This was the sixth Sun Belt women's soccer tournament title for the South Alabama women's soccer program and the second for head coach Richard Moodie.

Bracket

Source:

Schedule

Quarterfinals

Semifinals

Final

Statistics

Goalscorers 
2 Goals
 Brenna McPartlan (South Alabama)
 Briana Morris (South Alabama)
 Moa Öhman (South Alabama)

1 Goal
 Karleen Bedre (Louisiana)
 Jimena Cabrero (Georgia State)
 Hailey Furio (Arkansas State)
 Tabea Griss (South Alabama)
 Gwen Mummert (Louisiana)
 Rachel Sutter (Louisiana)

Own Goals
 Arkansas State vs. South Alabama

All-Tournament team

Source:

MVP in bold

See also 
 2019 Sun Belt Conference Men's Soccer Tournament

References 

Sun Belt Conference Women's Soccer Tournament
2019 Sun Belt Conference women's soccer season
Women's sports in Alabama